Lifering may refer to:
 
 Lifebuoy
 LifeRing Secular Recovery